Sphagnum falcatulum is a species of peat moss.  It occurs in Australia where it has been recorded from New South Wales, Victoria and Tasmania, including subantarctic Macquarie Island, as well as from New Zealand and South America.  It occurs in wetlands from near sea level to subalpine sites, often in water where the plants have a feathery appearance.

References

falcatulum
Flora of New South Wales
Flora of Victoria (Australia)
Flora of Tasmania
Flora of Macquarie Island
Flora of New Zealand
Flora of the Chatham Islands
Flora of the Auckland Islands
Plants described in 1885